Alfred Briggs Irion (February 18, 1833 – May 21, 1903) was a U. S. Representative for Louisiana's 6th congressional district.

Biography
Born near rural Evergreen in Avoyelles Parish, Irion attended the common schools, Franklin College in Opelousas, and graduated from the University of North Carolina at Chapel Hill in 1855. He studied law privately and was admitted to the bar in 1857. He launched his practice  in Marksville, the seat of government of Avoyelles Parish. He served as delegate to the Louisiana secession convention in 1860 and opposed the secession of the southern states.

During the Civil War, Irion served in the Confederate States Army. He was in the 28th Texas Cavalry Regiment under Colonel Horace Randal, part of General John George Walker's Greyhound Division.
He served as member of the Louisiana House of Representatives in 1864 and 1865. when he returned to his law practice. He was the editor of a local newspaper in Marksville from 1866 to 1874. He moved to his native Evergreen in 1870 and engaged there in planting. He continued the practice of law and also engaged in literary pursuits. He was a member of the Louisiana Constitutional Convention in 1879. From 1880 to 1884, he served as judge of the Louisiana Court of Appeal for the Third Circuit.

Irion was elected as a Democrat to the Forty-ninth Congress (March 4, 1885 – March 3, 1887) but was an unsuccessful candidate for renomination. He died in New Orleans and is interred in the Baptist Cemetery in Evergreen, Louisiana.

Notes

References

1833 births
1903 deaths
University of North Carolina at Chapel Hill alumni
Confederate States Army personnel
Democratic Party members of the United States House of Representatives from Louisiana
Louisiana state court judges
Circuit court judges in the United States
Democratic Party members of the Louisiana House of Representatives
Journalists from Louisiana
Burials in Louisiana
19th-century American politicians
19th-century American judges